The Mongol Rally is an intercontinental car rally that begins in Europe and ends in Ulan-Ude, Russia. The rally originally ended in Ulaanbaatar, Mongolia. However, to avoid punitive costs and taxes associated with vehicle imports and disposal, the rally now passes through Mongolia and ends in Ulan-Ude. The principal launch is from Goodwood Circuit in the United Kingdom, with subsidiary starting points in the Czech Republic. There are three fundamental rules to the rally:

Rally vehicles have a 1200cc engine limit, but ideally under 1000cc
Rally teams are unsupported
Rally teams need to raise at least £500 for charity

The organizers ("The Adventurists") are careful to point out that racing on highways is illegal. There are other differences from mainstream rallies, particularly the fact that no support team is provided and no other arrangements are made such as for accommodation, maintenance, or fuel.

History
The inaugural rally took place in 2004, in which six teams started and four completed the course. The second rally, in 2005, was entered by 43 teams, and 18 automobiles arrived intact in Ulan Bator. The 2006 rally began on 22 July with 167 cars setting off; 117 made it to Ulan Bator.

The Mongol Rally was run as a charity event from 2004 to 2006 with all of the proceeds from the entry fees used to organise the event with the remaining donated to charity. This changed from 2007 as the event is now organised by the League of Adventurists International Ltd, a privately owned profit making UK company. However, the participants continue to raise money for charities through sponsorship.

The 2007 rally left Hyde Park, London, on 21 July and was limited to 200 teams. Registration for 2007 was far more popular than the organisers could have foreseen, with the first 100 places allocated in 22 seconds. Due to this popularity, the final 50 places were awarded on the result of a ballot. In 2007, places were awarded for 2008 in two sign ups with places assigned on 1 November and 7 November. The entry fee was £650 per team. The main British starting point moved from Hyde Park, London, to Goodwood in West Sussex for the 2009 to 2012 events. Cars lapped the circuit in procession before departing. In 2013 the launch was from Bodiam Castle in Sussex and in 2014 it returned to London, launching from Battersea Park.

Routes 

There are an array of suggested routes that teams may take. After setting off from Goodwood or one of the other Western European start points (including France, Italy, and Spain), participants then generally proceed to a launch party in Prague where they converge. Typical routes then head for Moscow, Kiev or Istanbul, though teams have travelled as far north as the Arctic Circle and as far south as Iran, Turkmenistan and Afghanistan. Teams taking the Ukraine/Russia route or the more southerly Turkey and Iran route often converge at Samarkand, Uzbekistan before proceeding north-east for Mongolia.

The final leg of the rally takes surviving vehicles into Mongolia and on to finish back in Russia in Ulan-Ude. None of the available routes is comfortable or safe: damage to cars, robberies and minor injuries are common. Year on year as the rally gains popularity, more and more car accidents occur and many participants require hospital treatment. On 6 August 2010, one British participant died and one other team mate was seriously hurt after a road accident in Iran (near the border between Iran and Turkmenistan).

The most countries ever passed through on the Mongol Rally is currently 41, done in 2018 by an Australian team, Destined to Flail.

Vehicles 

The original rules stated cars should be under 1000cc with no age limit. In 2009 Mongolian import restrictions meant that vehicles must be less than 10 years old and the engine limit was raised to 1200cc to account for the difficulty in finding modern cars under 1000cc. In 2013 Mongolian import restrictions meant that vehicles had to be less than 5 years old.

Because vehicles less than 5 years old are outside the budget of many people in 2014 the rules were 'devolved' it was decided that cars of any age would be allowed on the Rally but they must be removed from Mongolia after the event. Without the import restrictions the engine size limit has reverted to 1000cc.

Motorcycles 
Motorcycles and scooters of up to 125cc are permitted on the Rally.

Other vehicles 
Comedy vehicles have always been welcome on the rally, but from 2010 to 2013 if they were over 1200cc or over 9 years old they needed to be removed after the Rally. From 2006 to 2012 emergency service vehicles were accepted for donation in Mongolia if they were in good condition, but in 2013 it was decided that Mongolia had no longer any practical need for these vehicles as it had begun to get new emergency vehicles from Japan and Korea.

After the rally 
Some of the cars do not make it to Mongolia; they are sold when they break down, or are left behind due to time pressure. They may not be simply abandoned without the participants responsible losing a deposit lodged with the organisers. Previous rally vehicles can now be found operating throughout Central Asia thanks to enterprising local mechanics who have repaired abandoned vehicles.

While the cars were imported to Mongolia and donated or sold for charity until 2013, in 2014 all Mongol Rally cars were shipped or driven back to Europe. The shipped cars were either collected by their owners or scrapped.

Prior to 2014 the organisers made arrangements for the cars to be imported into Mongolia without import duties. From 2004-06 they made use of a standard procedure used by non-profit making organisations, charities, and non-governmental organisations in Mongolia that provides exemption from the most significant taxes levied on older vehicles. Under Mongolian law the importing organization in Mongolia was then prevented from selling the vehicle for 3 years. Since 2007 the organizers had a special agreement with the Mongolian government. The cars will be auctioned and the money raised donated to a project as chosen by the drivers of each car.

There were many organizations in Mongolia who were grateful for the vehicles; furthermore, the low cost of labour in Mongolia made it economical to repair and run old cars that would be scrapped in Europe. Nevertheless, due to the concerns, the organizers of the Rally stipulated in the contract with teams in 2006 that they should not remove components from the car, such as the rear seats, to ensure that the vehicles remained useful and achieved a reasonable return at auction.

Teams 
On average, between 250 and 300 teams enter the rally annually. Most teams have 2-4 people.

Entry fee 

In 2004 there was no entry fee, although the 6 teams had to raise a minimum of £500 each, to be paid directly to that year's rally charity Send a Cow.  In 2005, an entry fee of £50 per person was paid to the organisers to cover the expenses of the rally.  Teams were also required to raise a minimum charity donation of £1000 per team split equally and paid directly to the chosen Charities Send a Cow and Save the Children.  In 2006, the entry fee payable to the organisers was increased to £227. Teams were required to raise a minimum of £1000 per team: £250 payable to Send a Cow with the remaining £750 payable to either Mercy Corps, CAMDA, Wild Cru or the Christina Noble Children's Foundation. In 2006, the teams taking part in the Rally together raised in excess of £200,000 for the Rally charities.

Since 2009 the entry fee has been set at £650, with an additional minimum charity donation set at £1000 per vehicle and a vehicle deposit of £500–repayable providing the vehicle is not dumped anywhere en route.

Organizers 
The Mongol Rally is now organized by the company set up by the founder, Tom Morgan, called The League of Adventurists International Limited (number 05995303) incorporated on 10 November 2006.

Sponsorship and TV coverage 
On the 2006 rally a number of TV crews accompanied teams along the route. The 2006 event was also sponsored by .travel with the sponsorship money going towards the cost of organising the event. The Expedia Let Yourself Go Team were also featured on the Expedia website. The Mongolian Taxi Service team appeared on the Fifth Gear motoring program as part of a feature on the toughness of the Daihatsu Charade, inspired by their own Charade completing the rally entirely unscathed.

Jack Osbourne, son of Ozzy and Sharon Osbourne, took part in the 2007 rally with Amaryllis Knight, the daughter of the former editor of The Economist and News Corporation director Andrew Knight, in a 1991 750cc Fiat Panda; their journey was aired on a television show named "Jack Osbourne, Mongol Rally".

In 2009, rallier Joe Sabia created Tupac in Kazakhstan, which pieced together dozens of Kazakhs to sing Changes by Tupac Shakur.  The video is the most widely watched Mongol Rally video with over a million views (June 2013).

Background 

The idea later formed part of Tom Morgan's BA degree in Sculpture and was displayed at the Winchester School of Art BA Degree Show in 2003.

Casualties
The rally website warns of the risks of this kind of adventure. 
An undisclosed number of racers have been injured since 2004. In 2010 an adventurer was killed and one injured in an accident while crossing Iran.

See also
Mongolia charity rally
Plymouth-Banjul Challenge
Budapest-Bamako
Charity rally
Silk Road Race

References

External links

Official Mongol Rally website
Mongol Rally website - History of the rally
The Adventurists website
Report about the Mongol Rally on ARTE TV
Film on the 10th Anniversary Mongol Rally
Mongol Rally: Three Weeks into the Unknown

Rally competitions in Mongolia
Sport in Mongolia
Motorsport in Asia
Road rallying
Automotive events
Cross-border races